The expression "Father of Lies" is an expression used in the New Testament to designate the Devil ("Liar and father of lies").

It can also designate:

 Father of lies, a 1988 novel by Brian Evenson
 "Father of Lies", an expression used to designate the Ancient Greek historian Herodotus